William Bock may refer to:
 William Bock (designer) (1847–1932), New Zealand engraver, medal designer and stamp designer
 William George Bock (1884–1973), Canadian politician and farmer